St John's Catholic School & Sixth Form College is a Coeducational Roman Catholic secondary school and sixth form with academy status. It is located on Woodhouse Lane in the town of Bishop Auckland, County Durham, England.

St John's Catholic School opened in 1964 and currently has 1372 pupils enrolled between the ages of 11 and 18 (of which 305 are aged 16–18).

School facilities include a swimming pool, sports hall, gymnasium and an Astroturf football pitch, all of which are used by the school and outside community groups.

St John's has a variety of after school clubs including a swimming club and chess club.

Notable people
 Sara Davies, entrepreneur, Dragon's Den
Jamie Campbell, star of the BBC Three documentary Jamie:Drag Queen at 16 who attended his end of school prom in Drag. The story was later adapted as the West End musical, Everybody's Talking About Jamie.

References 

 Department for Education

External links 
 Official Site

Secondary schools in County Durham
Catholic secondary schools in the Diocese of Hexham and Newcastle
Educational institutions established in 1964
1964 establishments in England
Academies in County Durham
Bishop Auckland